99.9 is a 1997 Spanish horror film directed and co-written by Agustí Villaronga. The film stars María Barranco as Lara, the host of a radio show focused on psychic and paranormal phenomena, who learns that her ex-boyfriend has been found dead in a small Spanish village. When she travels to the village, she discovers that he had been performing experiments to connect with otherworldly spirits. The film's title has been described as referring to both the dial of a radio station and as an inversion of "666" (the "number of the beast").

Cinematographer Javier Aguirresarobe served as director of photography on 99.9, and composer Javier Navarrete provided the score. The film screened at the 1997 Sitges Film Festival, where it won the festival's award for Best Cinematography.

Cast
 María Barranco as Lara
 Terele Pávez as Dolores
 Ruth Gabriel as Julia
 Ángel de Andrés López as Lázaro
 Gustavo Salmerón as Víctor

Home media
In 2021, a 2K restoration of the film was released on Blu-ray and DVD by the Cult Epics label.

References

Bibliography

External links
 

1990s Spanish films
1997 horror films
1997 films
1990s Spanish-language films
Films about radio people
Spanish horror films